Timothy Schedl (born 1955 in Iowa City, Iowa) is a professor of genetics at Washington University in St. Louis.

Biography

Early life and education
Timothy Bruce Schedl was born in 1955 to University of Iowa chemistry professor Harold Schedl and professor of art Naomi Schedl. He has two brothers, Andrew Schedl and Paul Schedl. He received his degree from Lawrence University in 1977.

Career
In 1990, he and his wife, Amy moved to St. Louis where he occupied the same position that he does now.  The Schedl lab studies germline development of the soil nematode C. elegans, and uses genetic, molecular, and cellular approaches to investigate germcell proliferation and entry into meiosis, progression through meiotic prophase, meiotic maturation and ovulation, and germline sex determination.

Schedl has published 33 papers with various people in his lab and his field.  One of his pictures also ended up as the cover of Science.

Marriage and children
He was married to his wife Amy in 1974, and now also has two children, Will and Maggie.

References

Schedl Lab; http://www.genetics.wustl.edu/tslab/

1955 births
Living people
American geneticists
Washington University in St. Louis faculty
Lawrence Technological University alumni